Dirk Van Oekelen (born 31 March 1971) is a Belgian football defender.

References

1971 births
Living people
Belgian footballers
KFC Turnhout players
Sint-Truidense V.V. players
R.W.D. Molenbeek players
K.S.K. Beveren players
Belgian Pro League players
Association football defenders
Sportspeople from Turnhout
Footballers from Antwerp Province